Qorqori (also Romanized as Qorqorī and Qarqarī; also known as Qorgorī) is a village in Qorqori Rural District, Qorqori District, Hirmand County, Sistan and Baluchestan Province, Iran. At the 2006 census, its population was 919, in 189 families.

References 

Populated places in Hirmand County